The Warmth of Other Suns: The Epic Story of America's Great Migration (2010) is a historical study of the Great Migration by Isabel Wilkerson and winner of the National Book Critics Circle Award. The book was widely acclaimed by critics.

Synopsis
The Warmth of Other Suns tells the story of the Great Migration, the movement of Black Americans out of the Southern United States to the Midwest, Northeast, and West from approximately 1915 to 1970. Throughout the twentieth century, this exodus of almost six million people changed the face of America. Wilkerson interviewed more than a thousand people, and gained access to new data and official records, to write this account of how these American journeys unfolded, altering cities, America and the American people.

With historical detail, Wilkerson tells this story through the lives of three unique individuals: Ida Mae Gladney, who in 1937 left sharecropping and prejudice in Mississippi for Chicago, where she achieved quiet blue-collar success and, in old age, voted for Barack Obama when he ran for an Illinois Senate seat; sharp and quick-tempered George Starling, who in 1945 fled Florida for Harlem, where he endangered his job fighting for civil rights, saw his family fall, and finally found peace in God; and Robert Foster, who left Louisiana in 1953 to pursue a medical career, the personal physician to Ray Charles as part of a glitteringly successful medical career, which allowed him to purchase a grand home where he often threw exuberant parties.

Title
The title of the book derives from a poem by author Richard Wright, who himself moved from the South to Chicago, in the 1920s. The poem is excerpted here:

Awards and honors
TIME 10 Best Nonfiction Books of the Decade 
New York University Arthur L. Carter Journalism Institute Top Ten Works of Journalism of the Decade
New York Times bestseller (Nonfiction, 2010)
New York Times Best Books of the Year (2010)
New York Times Notable Book of the Year (Nonfiction, 2010)
Salon Book Award (Nonfiction, 2010)
Publishers Weekly’s Top 10 Best Books (2010)
National Book Critics Circle Award (Nonfiction, 2011)
ALA Notable Book (2011)
Dayton Literary Peace Prize (Non-Fiction runner-up, 2011)
Pen-Galbraith Literary Award (Shortlist, 2011)
Anisfield-Wolf Book Award (2011)
Heartland Prize (Nonfiction, 2011)
Mark Lynton History Prize (2011)
The Hillman Prize (2011)
Hurston/Wright Award (2011)

The Warmth of Other Suns was a New York Times and national best seller, garnering half a dozen juried prizes. The book was named to more than 30 Best of the Year lists, including The New York Times’ 10 Best Books of the Year, Amazon’s 5 Best Books of 2010 and Best of the Year lists in The New Yorker, The Los Angeles Times, The Washington Post, and The Boston Globe, among others.

Toni Morrison described the book as "profound, necessary, and a delight to read". Tom Brokaw praised it as "an epic for all Americans who want to understand the making of our modern nation". Critics acclaimed it as "a massive and masterly account" (The New York Times Book Review, cover review); "a deeply affecting, finely crafted and heroic book" (The New Yorker); "a brilliant and stirring epic" (The Wall Street Journal).

Editions
The Warmth of Other Suns: The Epic Story of America's Great Migration, Random House (hardcover, first), 
Paperback, electronic book, and audiobook editions

Adaptations 
In 2012, Ballet Memphis commissioned a production inspired by The Warmth of Other Suns entitled "Party of the Year." The ballet, choreographed by Matthew Neenan, is about a birthday bash on Christmas 1970 and is based on characters in the book.

In 2015, a television adaptation of The Warmth of Other Suns was announced. Executive produced by Shonda Rhimes, the book was slated for a limited historical drama series. The project is currently in development with Shondaland, Rhimes' production company.

References

External links
The Warmth of Other Suns, official book website
Random House Publisher's website, with Synopsis
C-SPAN Q&A interview with Wilkerson on The Warmth of Other Suns, September 26, 2010
Wilkerson Interview with Krista Tippett, "On Being" broadcast November 2016

2010 non-fiction books
Books about African-American history
African-American demographics
Works about internal migrations in the United States